The Laboratory of Tree-Ring Research (LTRR) was established in 1937 by A.E. Douglass, founder of the modern science of dendrochronology.  The LTRR is a research unit in the College of Science at the University of Arizona in Tucson.  Since its founding, visiting scholars and faculty at the lab have done notable work in the areas of climate change, fire history, ecology, archeology and hydrology.

References

External links
 
 

Multidisciplinary research institutes
University of Arizona